Murten/Morat railway station is a railway station in the municipality of Murten, in the Swiss canton of Fribourg. It is located at the southern junction of the standard gauge Fribourg–Ins and Palézieux–Lyss lines of Swiss Federal Railways.

Services 
 the following services stop at Murten/Morat:

 RER Fribourg  / :

References

External links 
 
 

Railway stations in the canton of Fribourg
Swiss Federal Railways stations